Barriox13,  Barrio13, B13 in short, is a street gang in South Los Angeles consisting of over 5000 members, many of which are active. It is divided into West Side Barriox13 and East Side Barriox13 gang with all members loyal to the Barriox13 gang. It was established in the early 1970s near El Segundo Boulevard and Main St in South Los Angeles, California. The Original group of Barriox13 gang members began the gang for self-protection. It is a South Side (Sureno) gang loyal to the Mexican Mafia prison gang.

It has been targeted by the Los Angeles County Sheriff's Department and the Los Angeles D.A. department with a Gang injunction in 2009. Sheriffs department have shot and killed 1 known Barriox13 gang members in the last 10 years, most times guns have been recovered near or on the slain gang members body. The Orange County Sheriff department has strangled one known Barriox13 gang member for domestic violence.

Barriox13 is an active street gang that is located within the original borders where the gang was started in the early 1970s. Barriox13 has an out going battle with  all Hispanic gangs in Compton: CV 155, CV 70, CV Largo36, CV Tortilla Flats gangs etc. According to rumours around South Central, Tortilla Flats have been hiding for the past 2 years and are avoiding conflict at all costs. And from South Central, South Los 13 gang. From Gardena, Cycos 13 gang that is inactive, practically has disappeared. Back in 2009 Bx13 and the Athens park bloods made a treaty peace alliance. But they have an out going battle with black gangs such as the Campanella Park Piru Bloods 135st. Piru Bloods and the Fruit Town Piru gang. They have a racial battle with of all crip gangs and some blood gangs. There allies are the Mexican Mafia, Gardena 13. Members of the gang are being targeted throughout all of Los Angeles. Barriox13 are more due to the younger teens known as (youngsters) of the gang to commit violent and brutal acts. Homicide detectives are still on the hunt for two 
men believed to be affiliated with the gang who are connected to recent vicious acts around the Compton area. Two members of the gang (Duck)20, and (Hands)20, recently have been murdered being involved with the South Central gang.

The gang is known for most of their narcotics and homicide work. They have spread over the past few years around Southern California of the residence of (Norwalk, Long Beach, San Bernardino, Riverside, Victorville, Orange County, Tijuana Mexico, Rosarito Mexico,  Tecate Mexico, Ontario Canada, etc.) the gang has a history of many criminal acts and is believed to be involved in human and drug trafficking.

Street gangs
Organizations established in the 1970s
Sureños